Christ on the Cross, Christ between the two murderers or Le Coup de Lance is a 1620 painting of the Crucifixion of Jesus by Peter Paul Rubens, originally intended for the Convent of the Friars Minor. It is now in the Koninklijnk Museum voor Schone Kunsten in Antwerp.

References

External links
Britannica
Study for the painting (V&A)

1620 paintings
Paintings by Peter Paul Rubens
Rubens
Horses in art
Paintings of the Virgin Mary
Paintings in the collection of the Royal Museum of Fine Arts Antwerp